Scholtz is a surname. Notable people with the surname include:

A.H.M. Scholtz, South African writer in Afrikaans, wrote his first and award-winning novel at the age of 72
Andrew Henry Martin Scholtz (1923–2004), South African writer
Bernard Scholtz (born 1990), Namibian cricketer
Bob Scholtz (born 1936), former American football offensive lineman
Bruce Scholtz (born 1958), former professional American football player
Christiaan Scholtz (born 1970), former South African rugby union player
Friedrich von Scholtz (born 1851), German general, served as commander on the Eastern Front in World War I
Gertrud Scholtz-Klink née Treusch (1902–1999), fervent Nazi Party member, leader of the National Socialist Women's League in Nazi Germany
Jean Scholtz, American computer scientist
Johannes du Plessis Scholtz (1900–1990), South African philologist, art historian, and art collector
Joseph D. Scholtz, Mayor of Louisville, Kentucky from 1937 to 1941
Klaus Scholtz (1908–1987), Kapitänleutnant with the Kriegsmarine during World War II
Lilly Scholtz (married name Gaillard) (born 1903), Austrian pair skater
Nicolaas Scholtz (born 1986), Namibian cricketer
Nikala Scholtz (born 1991), professional tennis player from Caledon, South Africa
Robert A. Scholtz, distinguished professor of Electrical engineering at University of Southern California
Rudi Scholtz (born 1979), South African-born Namibian cricketer
Tom Scholtz (born 1947), American rock musician, songwriter, guitarist, keyboardist, inventor, and mechanical engineer

See also
Armee-Abteilung Scholtz, army level command of the German Army in World War I
Scholtzia